The MV Cathlamet is an  operated by Washington State Ferries.

History
In 1991, in order to keep up with growing demand, the Cathlamet, along with many of her sister ships were upgraded from Issaquah class to Issaquah 130-class ferries, by adding additional vehicle areas above the vehicle areas along the outside edge of the ferry. These upgrades had been planned for in the original design of the vessels. The ferry's passenger cabin was updated in the late 1990s, included in the upgrades were the removal of many tables located in the passenger cabin to allow for the bench seats to be spaced closer together in some sections of the ship, and an upgrade of the galley area.

Control issue
The Cathlamet is infamous in Puget Sound as it has on several occasions struck ferry docks while attempting to dock—occasionally referred to by Whidbey Island residents as the "Can't-land-it" and the "Crash-lamet," and a 1986 crash at the Mukilteo dock caused $500,000 in damage.  The problem was eventually traced to the computer that controls the pitch of the props, which because of a large amount of unshielded wiring, would short out a couple of signal lines causing the props to re-angle for full propulsion, instead of reversing.  The computer system was eventually replaced in the early 2000s, and since then, the Cathlamet has had two collisions.

Status
In late June 2014, the new   replaced the Cathlamet on the Mukilteo/Clinton route. Since being assigned to the North Vashon Triangle route, the Cathlamet has often been used as a relief boat elsewhere showing up on the Seattle-Bremerton route or the Mukilteo-Clinton route in planned and unplanned shortages. In 2011 she sailed between Edmonds and Clinton for a few days due to work being done on the Mukilteo dock.

Washington State Ferries estimated that repairs on the ferry would last at least a month.

A year later, on July 28, 2022, the Cathlamet collided with the pilings near the Fauntleroy dock around 8a.m., sustaining significant damage to one end in the process. According to WSDOT, no injuries were reported.

References

External links
 

Washington State Ferries vessels
1981 ships
Maritime incidents in 2022
Ships built in Seattle